Beverley Clifford was an Australian magazine photographer and photojournalist active during the 1950s-1970s.

Career
Beverley Clifford produced photographs for magazines, books, government and commercial commissions and projects, much of it made on the Northern Beaches and in Sydney during her professional career. Husband Ken also worked as a medical photographer at the University of Sydney and the couple collaborated on a number of projects.

In 1991 collector Dale Egan of Warriewood discovered a trove of 4,000 lost photos of Sydney beaches made between the 1930s and the 1970s by the Cliffords.

Critical reception
Clifford worked in the mid-1950s as a government typist before joining a number of women infiltrating the field of professional freelance photojournalism that had so long been the domain of men. She was sole illustrator for the 1969 coffee table book, Sydney, more than a harbor : a photographic glance at a surging city that was reviewed in by ’Scrutarius’ (journalist H. C. (Peter) Fenton) in Walkabout magazine in which he writes that while the obvious landmarks of the "bridge and the opera house, “Paddo’s” iron lacework, Bondi and Manly beaches, the post office colonnade and the tall glass boxes that, with telephoto lens treatment, constricts Pitt Street into more of a claustrophobic canyon than it really is,..." and a soccer crowd which... Photographically...is well justified by the warmly appropriate touch of an argument erupting in the near foreground. Indeed, most of the behind-scenes pictures seem to have been selected for the human quirks they encapsulate—the fiercely vocal woman at a political meeting, the clasped couple testing Luna Park’s “love-meter”, the patience of anglers on a jetty’s timbers and of passengers sitting in front of Central’s train indicator board, the extraordinary character declaiming in the Domain. These are all quite cleverly caught in action or inaction.

Clifford contributed images for a number of other books on Australia, including Camera in Australia published in 1970, which also included work by Max Dupain, Kerry Dundas, David Moore, and Wolfgang Sievers, and I. V. Hansen's The tiger and the Rose.

Award
Artiste (AFIAP) 1967.

Magazine articles 
 
 
 
 
 
 
 
 
 
 
 
 
 
 
 
 
 
 
 
 
 Archibald   Memorial   Fountain   in   Hyde   Park,    Sydney, 
 
 Warragamba Dam

Collections 
 National Library of Australia
 State Library of New South Wales

References

Australian women photographers
Australian photojournalists
20th-century photographers
20th-century Australian journalists
Australian women journalists
20th-century women photographers
AFIAP
20th-century Australian women
Women photojournalists